

Places 
Snaith, town in England
Snaith and Cowick
RAF Snaith

People

with the surname Snaith 
Norman Snaith (1898–1982), British bible scholar
Dan Snaith (1978–), Canadian musician
Nina Snaith (1974–), British mathematician
Victor Snaith (1944–), mathematician (Snaith's theorem)